Nelore or Nellore cattle originated from Ongole Cattle (Bos indicus) cattle originally brought to Brazil from India. They are named after the district of Nellore in Andhra Pradesh state in India. The Nelore has a distinct large hump over the top of the shoulder and neck. They have long legs which help them to walk in water and when grazing. The Nelore can adapt to all  except very cold climates. They are very resistant to high temperatures and have natural resistance to various parasites and diseases. Brazil is the largest breeder of Nelore.  Nelore have the shortest ears of most Bos indicus types. There is a naturally polled strain of the breed.

Breed history
The first pair of Ongole Cattle arrived in Brazil by ship in 1868, at Salvador, Bahia. Manoel Ubelhart Lemgruber, from Rio de Janeiro Zoo, bought two more from Hamburg Zoo in 1878. The most recent importations from India were of one hundred animals in the 1960s. The Nelore herd book was founded in 1975.

In the first decades of twentieth century, the favored breed of zebu in Brazil was the Indubrasil or Indo-Brazilian, but from the 1960s onwards, Nelore became the primary breed of cattle in Brazil because of its hardiness, heat-resistance, and because it thrives on poor-quality forage and breeds easily, with the calves rarely requiring human intervention to survive. Currently more than 80% of beef cattle in Brazil (approximately 167,000,000 animals) are either purebred or hybrid Nelore, making them the majority breed in Brazil. Bulls of this breed have been exported to many other countries in the Western Hemisphere, such as United States and Venezuela in the last decades.

Main lineages in Brazil

The vast majority of Nelores created today comes from lineages that entered Brazil from India in the 1950s and 60's. These lineages are: Karvardi, Taj Mahal, Golias, Godhavari, Rastan, Akasamu and Padhu(4).

References

External links

 Nelore Cattle-Cattle Today
 (1) ACNB: Associação dos Criadores de Nelore do Brasil (Nelore Breeders Association of Brazil) (official site, in Brazilian Portuguese)
 (2) ABCZ: Associação Brasileira dos Criadores de Zebu (Brazilian Zebu Breeders Association) (in Brazilian Portuguese)
 (3) Site in English
 (4) Short site in English
 (5) Site in Portuguese
 (6) FAO site

Cattle breeds originating in India
Cattle breeds
Animal husbandry in Andhra Pradesh
Beef cattle breeds